Scoutreach was a division of the Boy Scouts of America that emphasized service to rural and urban areas and to minority populations. It became the All Markets Strategy.

The African American Focus works with African American populations in partnerships with the NAACP, various African American churches and other groups. The Hispanic/Latino Focus includes the ¡Scouting - Vale La Pena! emphasis for Hispanic youth that provides Spanish language resources such as handbooks, training material, and videos. The Soccer and Scouting emphasis is a partnership with the National Soccer Coaches Association of America to provide alternatives for Cub Scout age Hispanic youth. The Asian American Focus reaches out to Indo-Chinese American, Vietnamese American, Chinese American, and Korean American communities. The Rural Scouting focus targets small communities and includes the American Indian Scouting Association in partnership with the Girl Scouts of the USA.

In 2004, the Scoutreach division launched the Scouting and Soccer program with an emphasis on outreach to Hispanic/Latino youth and families.

History

Protests over the inclusion of African Americans arose early in the program. When W.D. Boyce departed the organization, he turned the Boy Scout corporation over to the members of the Executive Board with the stipulation that the Boy Scouts would not discriminate on the basis of race or creed. The BSA accepted Boyce's condition, yet by the 1914 Annual Meeting, it adopted a policy allowing local councils to deny membership to African Americans. One segregated council (Old Hickory Council, North Carolina) completed its integration plans in 1974, merging two white districts and one black district ten years after the passage of the federal civil rights act.

The BSA began expanding the Negro Scouting program: by 1927 thirty-two communities in the south had "colored troops", with twenty-six troops in Louisville, Kentucky. Based on the work in the Chickasaw Council in Memphis, Bolton Smith directed the creation of the BSA's "National Committee on Inter-Racial Activities." This committee coordinated the creation of African American Scout troops. For this he was elected a national vice-president. Some councils, like the Piedmont Area Council would run segregated programs, or camps. Piedmont once ran two camps near Lynchburg, Camp Tye Brook and Camp Bolton Smith. The former for white scouts, and the latter for black.

However, during its first fifty years, the BSA struggled with minority communities because they were not seen as a source of strong membership. At the end of the 1960s, the national leadership saw the underserved communities, primarily in urban areas, and created their new "Urban Emphasis." The BSA's modernization and new "urban emphasis" was consistent with similar trends in Scouting all over the world starting in the 1960s. Much of these changes could be seen in the 8th Edition of the Boy Scout Handbook used from 1972 - 79. The Urban Emphasis program, and some other Hispanic outreach initiatives, were the forerunner of today's "Scoutreach."

Since the adoption of the 1914 racial policy, the African American community has struggled to allow African Americans to join the BSA and then endured segregated facilities and programs. Even after the Brown decision in 1954 and the Civil Rights Act of 1964, the BSA refused to reject its 1914 racial policy. It was a NAACP 1974 lawsuit against the LDS and the BSA which finally forced the BSA to issue a non-discrimination policy on the basis of race. Scoutreach is an effort to help overcome past problems in the program.

See also
Boy Scouts of America membership controversies

References

External links
 
 
 
 

Boy Scouts of America